Lieve  is a Dutch language feminine name derived from the Godelieve ("dear to God"), a female 11th-century Flemish saint. The masculine given name is probably a form of Lieven. Both names contain the Germanic element "lief-" ("dear") and lief and lieve still retain that meaning in Dutch. People with the name include:

Feminine
Lieve Fransen (born 1950), Belgian HIV/AIDS activist
Lieve Joris (born 1953), Belgian non-fiction writer 
Lieve van Kessel (born 1977), Dutch field hockey player
Lieve Maes (born 1960), Belgian N-VA politician
Lieve Slegers (born 1965), Belgian long-distance runner
Lieve Van Ermen (born 1948), Belgian politician and cardiologist
Lieve Wierinck (born 1957), Belgian VLD politician and MEP

Masculine
Lieve Geelvinck (1676–1743), Dutch administrator of the Dutch East India Company, mayor of Amsterdam
Lieve Verschuier (1627–1686), Dutch maritime painter

See also
Lieve Hugo (1934–1975), stage name ("Dear Hugo") of the Surinamese singer J.T. Hugo Uiterloo 
Ons' Lieve Heer op Solder, 17th century canal house, house church, and museum in the city center of Amsterdam, Netherlands
Onze Lieve Vrouweplein, square in the centre of Maastricht in The Netherlands
Onze-Lieve-Vrouw ten Troost, simply known as the Troostkerk, is a basilica in Vilvoorde, Belgium
Onze-Lieve-Vrouw-Waver, Belgian village roughly 10 km east of Mechelen

References

Dutch feminine given names
Dutch masculine given names